The 2012 United States presidential election in Minnesota took place on November 6, 2012, as part of the 2012 United States presidential election in which all 50 states plus the District of Columbia participated. State voters chose ten electors to represent them in the Electoral College via a popular vote pitting incumbent Democratic President Barack Obama and his running mate, Vice President Joe Biden, against Republican challenger and former Massachusetts Governor Mitt Romney and his running mate, Congressman Paul Ryan.

Minnesota backed Obama for re-election, giving him 52.65% of the vote, while Republican challenger Mitt Romney took 44.96%, a victory margin of 7.69%. With ten Democratic wins in a row, Minnesota has the longest current streak of voting for the Democratic candidate in presidential elections of any state, having not voted Republican since Richard Nixon in 1972. This is the longest streak for the Democrats in history amongst non-Southern states. 

However, Romney was able to significantly improve on McCain's performance in the North Star State, as he did nationally. Fourteen counties which voted for Obama in 2008 flipped and voted for the Republican Party in 2012, while many Democratic counties had a margin of victory much narrower than in 2008. Many of these counties had not voted for a Republican in decades, such as Big Stone County which only voted for a Republican only once since 1952 for Dwight D. Eisenhower until this election.

As of the 2020 presidential election, this is the most recent time the Democratic candidate won the following counties: Beltrami, 
Chippewa, Fillmore, Freeborn, Houston, Itasca, Kittson, Koochiching, Lac qui Parle, Mahnomen, Mower, Norman, Rice, Swift, and Traverse. It is also, to date, the most recent time that Minnesota voted to the left of Colorado and Virginia, two former Republican strongholds that rapidly transitioned to being reliably blue in the 2010s.

Caucuses

Democratic

Republican

The Republican caucuses were held on February 7, 2012. The events coincided with the Colorado Republican caucuses as well as the Missouri Republican primary. Minnesota has a total of 40 delegates, 37 of which are tied to the caucuses while 3 are unpledged RNC delegates. The non-binding straw poll was won by Rick Santorum, but Ron Paul won 32 of the 40 delegates to the Republican National Convention.

Conventions
There is no formal system of allocating delegates to candidates in any step of the election process. At each meeting the participants decides what the best course of action is. The state convention can vote to bind the 13 at-large delegates to a candidate. The 24 delegates elected at the CD conventions and the 3 automatic (RNC) delegates are not legally bound to vote for a candidate.
 17 February - 31 March: BPOU conventions elect delegates to the state convention and the congressional district conventions.
 14–21 April: Eight congressional conventions elect 3 National Convention delegates each.
 18–19 May: State convention elect 13 National Convention delegates.

General election

Results

By county

Counties that flipped from Democratic to Republican

 Aitkin (largest city: Aitkin)
 Big Stone (largest city: Ortonville)
 Grant (largest city: Elbow Lake)
 Lincoln (largest city: Tyler)
 Marshall (largest city: Warren)
 Murray (largest city: Slayton)
 Pennington (largest city: Thief River Falls)
 Pine (largest city: Pine City)
 Polk (largest city: East Grand Forks)
 Pope (largest city: Glenwood)
 Red Lake (largest city: Red Lake Falls)
 Stevens (largest city: Morris)
 Watonwan (largest city: St. James)
 Yellow Medicine (largest city: Granite Falls)

Results by congressional district
Obama won 6 of 8 congressional districts, including two held by Republicans. Romney won 2, including one held by a Democrat.

See also
 United States presidential elections in Minnesota
 2012 Republican Party presidential debates and forums
 2012 Republican Party presidential primaries
 Results of the 2012 Republican Party presidential primaries

References

External links
 2012 Election Central: 2012 Primary Schedule
 The Green Papers: Minnesota Republican Delegation 2012
 The Green Papers: Major state elections in chronological order

Minnesota
United States president
2012